A trochophore (also spelled trocophore) is a type of free-swimming planktonic marine larva with several bands of cilia.

By moving their cilia rapidly, they make a water eddy, to control their movement, and to bring their food closer, to capture it more easily.

Occurrence 
Trochophores exist as a larval form within the trochozoan clade, which include the entoprocts, molluscs, annelids, echiurans, sipunculans and nemerteans.  Together, these phyla make up part of the Lophotrochozoa; it is possible that trochophore larvae were present in the life cycle of the group's common ancestor.

Etymology 
The term trochophore derives from the ancient Greek , meaning "wheel", and  — or  —, meaning 'to bear, to carry', because the larva is bearing a wheel-shaped band of cilia.

Feeding habits 
Trochophore larvae are often planktotrophic; that is, they feed on other plankton species.

Life cycle

The example of the development of the annelid Pomatoceros lamarckii (family Serpulidae) shows various trochophore stages (image: D-F):
D - early trochophore ;
E - complete trochophore ;
F - late trochophore ;
G - metatrochophore.

References

External links 

 

Larvae
Lophotrochozoa